Pettibone v. United States, 148 U.S. 197 (1893), is a United States Supreme Court criminal case involving the knowledge requirement in an obstruction of justice case. It was the first Supreme Court case involving interpretation of obstruction of justice statutes (currently United States Code Section 1503). Chief Justice Fuller wrote, "a person is not sufficiently charged with obstructing or impeding the due administration of justice in a court unless it appears that he knew of had notice that justice was being administered in such court".

References

External links
 

1893 in United States case law
United States Supreme Court cases
United States Supreme Court cases of the Fuller Court